Adrian Ioana (born 18 January 1981, Târgu Jiu) is a Romanian mathematician. He is currently a professor at the University of California, San Diego.

Ioana earned a BS in Mathematics from the University of Bucharest in 2003, and completed his PhD at the University of California, Los Angeles in 2007, under the supervision of Sorin Popa.  He then was an postdoc at the California Institute of Technology and a Research Fellow supported by the Clay Mathematics Institute, after which he joined UC San Diego in 2011.

For his contributions to von Neumann algebras and representation theory of groups, he was awarded a 2012 EMS Prize. In 2018 he was an invited speaker at the International Congress of Mathematicians (ICM) in Rio de Janeiro (on "Rigidity for von Neumann algebras").

References

External links
Website at UCSD

1981 births
Living people
21st-century Romanian mathematicians
University of California, Los Angeles alumni
University of California, San Diego faculty
Place of birth missing (living people)
International Mathematical Olympiad participants
People from Târgu Jiu
University of Bucharest alumni